Mitophis asbolepis is an endangered species of snake in the family Leptotyphlopidae. It is endemic to the Dominican Republic on the Caribbean island of Hispaniola.

References

Mitophis
Reptiles described in 1985
Endemic fauna of the Dominican Republic
Reptiles of the Dominican Republic